is a railway station on the Keihan Electric Railway Nakanoshima Line in Kita-ku, Osaka, Japan, and opened on October 19, 2008 (the day of the opening of the Nakanoshima Line).

Station layout
An island platform serving two tracks is located on the 3rd basement, ticket gates are on the 2nd basement, and an underground mall called "MINAMO" is on the 1st basement. This station is directly connected to Higobashi Station on the Osaka Municipal Subway Yotsubashi Line (Exit 4) via the underground passage under Yotsubashi-suji.

Surroundings
Dojima Underground Shopping Center (Dotica)

Train stations
Osaka Metro Yotsubashi Line Higobashi Station (via Higo Bridge)
JR West JR Tōzai Line Kitashinchi Station (via Watanabe Bridge and Dojima Underground Shopping Center (Dotica))
Osaka Metro Yotsubashi Line Nishi-Umeda Station (via Watanabe Bridge and Dojima Underground Shopping Center (Dotica))
Hanshin Railway Main Line Umeda Station (via Watanabe Bridge and Dojima Underground Shopping Center (Dotica))
JR West Osaka Station (via Watanabe-bridge and Dojima Underground Shopping Center (Dotica))

Major facilities
Dōjimahama Itchōme, Kita-ku
Aqua Dojima
ANA Crowne Plaza Osaka
Dōjimahama Nichōme, Kita-ku
Suntory
Dojima Hotel
Furukawa Osaka Building
Toyobo
Nakanoshima Nichōme, Kita-ku
Nakanoshima Festival Tower East Building (39 stories, 200m high)
Asahi Shimbun head office
Festival Hall
Nakanoshima Post Office

Nakanoshima Sanchōme, Kita-ku
Asahi Shimbun Building (former Osaka head office)
Asahi Building
Nakanoshima Festival Tower West Building (scheduled to be completed in spring or summer 2017, 42 stories, 200m high)
Nakanoshima Mitsui Building
Kansai Electric Power Co., Inc. (KEPCO Building)
Nakanoshima Daibiru (35 stories, 160m high)
Daibiru Honkan (26 stories, 120m high)
Sumitomo Nakanoshima Building
Dōjima Itchōme, Kita-ku
Dojima Avanza
Junkudo
Dōjima Nichōme, Kita-ku
Dentsu Osaka Building
Keihan Dōjima Building
Kintetsu Dōjima Building
Shin Fujita Building
Chunichi Shimbun Osaka Branch
Dōjima Sanchōme, Kita-ku
NTT Telepark Dojima
Nakanoshima Yonchōme, Kita-ku
The National Museum of Art, Osaka
Osaka Science Museum

Rivers, bridges, and streets
Dojima River
Watanabe Bridge, Tamino Bridge, Tamae Bridge
Tosabori River
Nishiki Bridge, Higo Bridge, Chikuzen Bridge, Joan Bridge
Nakanoshima-dori
Yotsubashi-suji

Bus stops
Osaka Municipal Transportation Bureau (Watanabebashi)
Route 53 for Osaka-ekimae (Osaka Station) / for Funatsubashi
Route 62, 75, 88, 88A, 103 for Osaka-ekimae (Osaka Station)
Hokko Kanko Bus Co.
Nakanoshima Loop Bus

Adjacent stations

Nakanoshima
Railway stations in Japan opened in 2008
Railway stations in Osaka Prefecture
Stations of Keihan Electric Railway